Seeger Memorial Junior-Senior High School is the single high school and middle school serving Warren County, Indiana, and is located a mile and a half north of the town of West Lebanon.  It is administered by the Metropolitan School District of Warren County in Williamsport.

History
Seeger High School was established in 1957 through a $250,000 donation from local grain dealer and broker Ura Seeger; classes began in the fall of 1959.  The school's original mascot was the Indian, and its colors red and grey, but in 1973 due to the consolidation of Pine Village, Williamsport, and Seeger High Schools, the mascot was changed to the Patriot and the colors to red, white and blue.  Gary McMillen became the consolidated school's first principal.  He was followed by Steve Lee, Dr. Roy Stroud, Richard Schelsky, Gary Kiger, Dan Nelson, and Rob Beckett.

Demographics
The demographic breakdown of the 568 students enrolled in 2013-14 was:
Male - 53.7%
Female - 46.3%
Native American/Alaskan - 0%
Asian/Pacific islanders - 0.5%
Black - 0.2%
Hispanic - 0.7%
White - 98.2%
Multiracial - 0.4%

39.3% of the students were eligible for free or reduced lunch.

Athletics
The Seeger Patriots compete in the Wabash River Conference.  The school colors are scarlet, navy blue and white.  The following IHSAA sanctioned sports are available:

•Baseball (boys)
•Cheerleading (girls & boys)
•Basketball (girls & boys)
•Cross country (girls & boys)
•Football (boys) (state champions, 2004)
•Golf (girls & boys)
•Softball (girls)
•Swimming (girls & boys)
•Tennis (girls & boys)
•Track (girls & boys)
•Volleyball (girls)
•Wrestling (boys)

Notable alumni
Stephanie White - WNBA player and head coach

See also
 List of high schools in Indiana

References

External links
 
 Metropolitan School District of Warren County

Public high schools in Indiana
Public middle schools in Indiana
Education in Warren County, Indiana
Buildings and structures in Warren County, Indiana
1957 establishments in Indiana